The Hester-Lenz House is a historic house at 905 AR 5 N in Benton, Arkansas. Built in 1836 on what was then the Southwest Trail or the Military Road, it may be the oldest surviving house in Saline County that remains in its original location, and it may have been the location of a vote for independence of the state of Arkansas. The original construction, a two-story log dogtrot believed to have been built about 1836–37, was modified in the late 19th century by German immigrants with their distinctive vernacular styling.

The house was listed on the National Register of Historic Places in 2004. It has also been known as the Oscar F. Lenz House, as the Lenggenhager House.

See also
 National Register of Historic Places listings in Saline County, Arkansas

References

Houses on the National Register of Historic Places in Arkansas
Houses completed in 1836
Houses in Saline County, Arkansas
Dogtrot architecture in Arkansas
Log houses in the United States
National Register of Historic Places in Saline County, Arkansas
Log buildings and structures on the National Register of Historic Places in Arkansas
Benton, Arkansas
1836 establishments in Arkansas